"Sweet Transvestite" is a song from the 1973 British musical stage production The Rocky Horror Show and its 1975 film counterpart The Rocky Horror Picture Show. The song is performed by the character, Dr Frank N. Furter, originally played by Tim Curry. The book, music and lyrics are by Richard O'Brien and the musical arrangements by Richard Hartley. It is in the key of E major.

It was originally the fourth song in the musical but it was later switched with its following number, "Time Warp", so that the latter came before Dr Frank N. Furter's entrance.

Overview
The song is performed by the character, Dr Frank N. Furter, originated on stage and screen by actor Tim Curry, who performed in all of the original productions except Australia's. This includes the short-lived first run on Broadway.

It introduces the character of Dr Frank N. Furter to the audience and Brad and Janet. He boasts where he's from, what he is, what he's been doing and why he does it. The song is one of the film and stage show's most famous and includes one of the show's most notorious lines, "I'm just a sweet transvestite from Transsexual, Transylvania". Later references in the film explain that it is not the Transylvania region of Europe, but instead a galaxy by that name, and that Transsexual is Frank's (as well as secondary characters Magenta and Riff-Raff's) home planet. Frank makes a passing reference in the lyrics to "a Steve Reeves movie;" O'Brien noted that he had a love for Reeves's films and incorporated that into the show.

Covers

Cover versions have been recorded by Anthony Head, Mina, Bates Motel, Trevor Byfield, The Steve Whitney Band, TSOL with Keith Morris, and punk rock band Apocalypse Hoboken on the 2003 tribute compilation The Rocky Horror Punk Rock Show.

Tom Hewitt performed the song during the 2000 Broadway revival.

The song was sung by Mercedes Jones (Amber Riley) in the Season 2 episode of Glee, "The Rocky Horror Glee Show".

Tim Curry's version (the film recording) was remixed for club play in 2011 by Joel Dickinson.

In Fox's 2016 televised tribute, The Rocky Horror Picture Show: Let's Do the Time Warp Again, the song was performed by actress Laverne Cox, who played the role of Dr Frank N. Furter.

References

Sweet Transvestite
Sweet Transvestite
Songs with lyrics by Richard O'Brien
Songs with music by Richard Hartley (composer)
Songs about cross-dressing